The South Korean ferry Seohae sank on October 10, 1993 in the Yellow Sea near Wido, Buan County, North Jeolla Province. 292 of the 362 passengers and crew on board were killed. 70 people were rescued.

At the time, this accident was the largest ferry disaster in South Korea since December 15, 1970, when 323 people on board were killed in the sinking of the ferry Namyoung (남영호).

Vessel 
Seohae was a ferry of 110 gross tons, with a maximum capacity of 221 passengers.

Accident

Overloading was a factor in the sinking. The rope, left behind by fishing operations, may have made the ferry heel over onto her starboard side.

Aftermath 
Divers were employed to help recover the bodies of deceased victims after the vessel sunk.

See also
 List of South Korean ferry disasters
 Sinking of MV Sewol

References

1993 in South Korea
Maritime incidents in 1993
Ferries of South Korea
Maritime incidents in South Korea
Shipwrecks in the Yellow Sea
October 1993 events
1993 disasters in South Korea